Sparodus is an extinct genus of microsaur within the family Gymnarthridae.

See also
 Prehistoric amphibian
 List of prehistoric amphibians

Microsauria